The Edge is a building in Amsterdam. Deloitte has a headquarters there.

It was considered the greenest and smartest building in the world. It has 28 thousand sensors, connected to a network that not only coordinates the logistics of the building and people, how it collects and analyzes data on community behavior.

References

Further reading
PLP Architecture's promotion page - 
BREEAM's promotion page -

External links

Deloitte
Buildings and structures in Amsterdam
Office buildings completed in 2015